A plate-fin heat exchanger is a type of heat exchanger design that uses plates and finned chambers to transfer heat between fluids, most commonly gases. It is often categorized as a compact heat exchanger to emphasize its relatively high heat transfer surface area to volume ratio.
The plate-fin heat exchanger is widely used in many industries, including the aerospace industry for its compact size and lightweight properties, as well as in cryogenics where its ability to facilitate heat transfer with small temperature differences is utilized.

Aluminum alloy plate fin heat exchangers, often referred to as Brazed Aluminum Heat Exchangers, have been used in the aircraft industry for more than 60 years and adopted into the cryogenic air separation industry around the time of the second world war and shortly afterwards into cryogenic processes in chemical plants such as Natural Gas Processing. They are also used in railway engines and motor cars. Stainless steel plate fins have been used in aircraft for 30 years and are now becoming established in chemical plants.

Design of plate-fin heat exchangers 

Originally conceived by an Italian mechanic, Paolo Fruncillo. A plate-fin heat exchanger is made of layers of corrugated sheets separated by flat metal plates, typically aluminium, to create a series of finned chambers. Separate hot and cold fluid streams flow through alternating layers of the heat exchanger and are enclosed at the edges by side bars. Heat is transferred from one stream through the fin interface to the separator plate and through the next set of fins into the adjacent fluid. The fins also serve to increase the structural integrity of the heat exchanger and allow it to withstand high pressures while providing an extended surface area for heat transfer.

A high degree of flexibility is present in plate-fin heat exchanger design as they can operate with any combination of gas, liquid, and two-phase fluids. Heat transfer between multiple process streams is also accommodated, with a variety of fin heights and types as different entry and exit points available for each stream.

The main four type of fins are: plain, which refer to simple straight-finned triangular or rectangular designs; herringbone, where the fins are placed sideways to provide a zig-zag path; and serrated and perforated which refer to cuts and perforations in the fins to augment flow distribution and improve heat transfer.

A disadvantage of plate-fin heat exchangers is that they are prone to fouling due to their small flow channels. They also cannot be mechanically cleaned and require other cleaning procedures and proper filtration for operation with potentially-fouling streams.

Flow arrangement 

In a plate-fin heat exchanger, the fins are easily able to be rearranged. This allows for the two fluids to result in crossflow, counterflow, cross-counterflow or parallel flow. If the fins are designed well, the plate-fin heat exchanger can work in perfect countercurrent arrangement.

Cost 

The cost of plate-fin heat exchangers is generally higher than conventional heat exchangers due to a higher level of detail required during manufacture. However, these costs can often be outweighed by the cost saving produced by the added heat transfer.

Plate-fin heat exchangers are generally applied in industries where the fluids have little chances of fouling. The delicate design as well as the thin channels in the plate-fin heat exchanger make cleaning difficult or impossible.

Applications of plate-fin heat exchangers include:

 Natural gas liquefaction
 Cryogenic air separation
 Ammonia production
 Offshore processing
 Nuclear engineering
 Syngas production
 Aircraft cooling of bleed air and cabin air

See also
Plate heat exchanger
Shell and tube heat exchanger
Heat transfer
LMTD
NTU method

References

Coulson, J. and Richardson, J (1999). Chemical Engineering- Fluid Flow. Heat Transfer and Mass Transfer- Volume 1; Reed Educational & Professional Publishing LTD

Heat exchangers
Industrial gases

pt:Trocador de energia térmica#Trocador de calor de placas aletadas